Annette Imhausen (also known as Annette Warner, born June 12, 1970) is a German historian of mathematics known for her work on Ancient Egyptian mathematics. She is a professor in the Normative Orders Cluster of Excellence at Goethe University Frankfurt.

Education and career
Imhausen studied mathematics, chemistry, and Egyptology at Johannes Gutenberg University Mainz, passing the Staatsexamen in 1996. She continued to study Egyptology and Assyriology at the Freie Universität Berlin. She completed her doctorate in the history of mathematics at Mainz in 2002 under the joint supervision of David E. Rowe and James Ritter.

She held a fellowship at the Dibner Institute for the History of Science and Technology (Cambridge, MA) before she was received a Junior Research Fellowship at the University of Cambridge from 2003 to 2006.
She returned to Mainz as an assistant professor from 2006 to 2008, and became a professor at Frankfurt in 2009.

Contributions
Imhausen is featured in the BBC TV series The Story of Maths.

Her dissertation, Ägyptische Algorithmen. Eine Untersuchung zu den mittelägyptischen mathematischen Aufgabentexten, was published by Harrassowitz Verlag in 2002 (Ägyptologische Abhandlungen, vol. 65).
She is also the author of Mathematics in Ancient Egypt: A Contextual History (Princeton University Press, 2016).

References

1970 births
Living people
21st-century German historians
21st-century German mathematicians
Women mathematicians
German historians of mathematics
Johannes Gutenberg University Mainz alumni
Academics of the University of Cambridge
Academic staff of Johannes Gutenberg University Mainz
Academic staff of Goethe University Frankfurt
German women historians
21st-century German women writers